MBC may refer to:

Broadcasting
 Major Broadcasting Cable Network, renamed to Black Family Channel
 Malawi Broadcasting Corporation, a Malawian state-run radio company 
 Manila Broadcasting Company, in the Philippines
 Mauritius Broadcasting Corporation, a public broadcaster of the Republic of Mauritius
 MBC Networks, Sri Lankan media company
 MBC TV (India), Oriya language broadcasting network
 MBC Group, Middle Eastern media conglomerate based in Dubai, United Arab Emirates
 Missinipi Broadcasting Corporation, a radio network in Canada
 Munhwa Broadcasting Corporation, a South Korean commercial broadcaster
 MBC TV (South Korean TV channel), a television channel from Seoul, South Korea
 Museum of Broadcast Communications, a museum located in Chicago, Illinois
 Minaminihon Broadcasting, a Japanese commercial broadcaster

Education
 Mary Baldwin College, in Staunton, Virginia, US
 Master of Business Communication, an academic degree
 Matthew Boulton College, in Birmingham, England
 Minneapolis Business College, located in Roseville, Minnesota, US
 Morris Brown College, in Atlanta, Georgia, US

Entertainment
 Miami Boys Choir, a Jewish contemporary music choir
 Monster Buster Club, a 3D animated series created by Mystery Animation and Jetix

Science and technology
 4-MBC, 4-methylbenzylidene camphor
 MBC-550, a personal computer produced by Sanyo
 Main-belt comet
 Metastatic breast cancer
 Meteor burst communications
 Minimum bactericidal concentration
 Myoblast city, a Drosophila melanogaster gene

Sports
 Manchester Baseball Club, a British baseball club
 Midwest Basketball Conference, 1935–1937, changed its name to the National Basketball League
 Mitteldeutscher BC, a German basketball club

Other uses 
 Maidstone Borough Council, the second level local authority for the Borough of Maidstone in Kent, United Kingdom
 Makati Business Club, a Filipino private non-stock, non-profit business association
 Manado Boulevard Carnaval, an annual fashion carnival in Manado, Indonesia
 Mathieu Bock-Côté (born 1980), Canadian academic and writer
 Mesoamerican Biological Corridor, an international conservation initiative for biodiversity protection across southern Mexico and Central America
 Metropolitan Borough Council, the authority for a type of local government district in England
 Michigan Brewing Company, in Webberville, Michigan, United States
 Missouri Baptist Convention, a religious organization in the United States
 Transports de la région Morges-Bière-Cossonay, a transport company in Switzerland
 Mutual Benefits Corporation, an investment sales company that operated a huge ponzi scheme